Nick Evans (born 9 January 1947 in Newport, Monmouthshire, South Wales) is a Welsh former jazz and progressive rock trombonist.

Career 
Evans worked in the Graham Collier Sextet (1968–69), Keith Tippett Group (1968–70), Soft Machine (1969), Brotherhood of Breath (1970–74), Centipede (1970–71), Just Us (1972–73), Ambush (1972), Ninesense (1975–80), Intercontinental Express (1976), Ark (1976, 1978), Nicra (1977), Dudu Pukwana's Diamond Express (1977), Spirits Rejoice (1978–79), and Dreamtime (1983).

Early years 
He started playing the trombone at age 11 and by 1966 he had joined the New Welsh Jazz Orchestra. In that period he first joined the Graham Collier Sextet. In 1968 at the Barry school he worked with Keith Tippett and became a founding member of his sextet. He later worked with South African band Brotherhood of Breath and also Soft Machine. He was a peripheral figure in the Canterbury Scene.

Evans also appeared on the album Lizard by the progressive rock band, King Crimson, in 1970.

Discography 
 1969 : The heart of the blues is sound by Champion Jack Dupree 
 1969 : Down Another Road by Graham Collier Sextet 
 1970 : Manfred Mann Chapter Three by Manfred Mann Chapter Three
 1970 : Third by Soft Machine 
 1970 : Lizard by King Crimson 
 1970 : You are here... I am there by Keith Tippett
 1970 : Die Jazz-Werkstatt '70 by Various Artists
 1971 : Conflagration by The Trio 
 1971 : Chris McGregor's Brotherhood Of Breath by Chris McGregor's Brotherhood of Breath
 1971 : Banana Moon by Daevid Allen 
 1971 : Out of nowhere by Henry Schifter
 1971 : Blue Memphis by Memphis Slim
 1971 : Fourth by Soft Machine 
 1971 : Dedicated To You, But You Weren't Listening by The Keith Tippett Group
 1971 : Brotherhood by Chris McGregor's Brotherhood Of Breath
 1971 : Septober Energy by Centipede
 1971 : Time of the Last Persecution by Bill Fay
 1971 : 1969 by Julie Driscoll
 1971 : Reg King by Reg King
 1971 : Rites and Rituals by Ray Russell
 1971 : Worker's Playtime by B B Blunder
 1972 : Graham Bell by Graham Bell
 1973 : 1984 by Hugh Hopper
 1974 : Live at Willisau by Chris McGregor's Brotherhood Of Breath
 1974 : Alexis Korner Mister Blues by Alexis Korner - With Mel Collins, Boz Burrell, Ian Wallace, Elton Dean, Zoot Money, etc.
 1975 : Sunset Glow by Julie Tippetts
 1975 : Desperate Straights by Slapp Happy/Henry Cow 
 1976 : Thunder into Our Hearts by Jabula
 1976 : London by Intercontinental Express
 1976 : Oh ! For The Edge by Elton Dean's Ninesense
 1977 : Triple Echo by Soft Machine - 3 LP Boxset
 1977 : Happy Daze by Elton Dean's Ninesense
 1977 : Listen/Hear by Nicra 
 1978 : Frames (Music For An Imaginary Film) by Keith Tippett's Ark
 1978 : Diamond Express by Dudu Pukwana
 1978 : Spirits Rejoice by Louis Moholo Octet
 1981 : Yes Please ! Angoulème 1981 by Chris McGregor's Brotherhood Of Breath
 1984 : Bunny Up by Dreamtime 
 1985 : Hat Music by Katie Perks 
 1985 : The Bologna Tapes by Elton Dean Quintet
 1986 : A Loose Kite In A Gentle Wind Floating With Only My Will For An Anchor by Keith Tippett Sextet
 1986 : T.R.O.U.B.L.E by Vic Godard
 1987 : Andy Sheppard by Andy Sheppard
 1988 : Alexis Korner And... 1972 - 1983 by Alexis Korner
 1988 : Copy Cats by Johnny Thunders & Patti Palladin
 1988 : Willkommen In West-Poind-Blanc by Clowns & Helden 
 1988 : Born to Cry by Johnny Thunders
 2001 : Travelling Somewhere by Chris McGregor's Brotherhood Of Breath
 2004 : Bremen to Bridgwater by Chris McGregor's Brotherhood Of Breath
 2008 : Eclipse at Dawn by Chris McGregor's Brotherhood Of Breath

References

External links
Calyx club
Brotherhood of Breath

1947 births
Living people
21st-century British male musicians
21st-century trombonists
Canterbury scene
Centipede (band) members
British male jazz musicians
Male trombonists
People from Newport, Wales
Soft Machine members
Welsh jazz trombonists